Lôn Las Ogwen is a  cycle route in the National Cycle Network which runs south from the NCN 5 at Porth Penrhyn on the north coast of Wales to Llyn Ogwen in Snowdonia. Lôn Las is Welsh for "blue lane".

From Porth Penrhyn to Penrhyn Quarry it follows the former Penrhyn Quarry Railway trackbed.

Route 
Porth Penrhyn | Glasinfryn | Tregarth | Bethesda | Nant Ffrancon | Ogwen Cottage | Llyn Ogwen

See also 
 Rail trail

References

External links 
 Recreational Routes, Gwynedd Council
 Lon Las Ogwen, Sustrans
 Lon Las Ogwen to Capel Curig, Mud & Routes
 NCN 82 on Open Cycle Map
 Ogwen Trail route description with photos
 Light at end of the tunnel for scenic Gwynedd path, Daily Post, 24 Feb 2017
 Are Wales' disused railway tunnels an untapped resource for tourism?, BBC News, Jan 2017

Cycleways in Wales
Transport in Gwynedd
Rail trails in Wales